Juan Pablo Terra (1924–1991) was a Uruguayan architect, sociologist, and political figure.

Background

His father Horacio Terra Arocena served as a Senator. His great-uncle Gabriel Terra was President of Uruguay 1931–1938.

Political offices
Juan Pablo Terra served both as a Deputy and a Senator.

Having begun his political career as a Uruguayan Christian Democrat, he subsequently represented the Frente Amplio (Broad Front) in the Senate, a grouping which he played a leading part in founding in 1971.

See also

 Politics of Uruguay
 List of political families#Uruguay

References
 :es:Juan Pablo Terra

References

1924 births
1991 deaths
Christian Democratic Party of Uruguay politicians
Broad Front (Uruguay) politicians
Members of the Chamber of Representatives of Uruguay
Members of the Senate of Uruguay
Uruguayan sociologists
20th-century Uruguayan architects